David Wrench is a Welsh musician, songwriter, producer and mixer based in London. His work has been nominated for Grammys, Brit Awards and shortlisted for numerous Mercury Prize nominations including the 2017 winning album Process by Sampha. and Arlo Parks 2021 'Collapsed in Sunbeams’. Wrench has been the recipient of the BBC Radio Cymru C2 Producer of the Year award five times in six years between 2007 and 2012 and has received Music Producer Guild Awards (MPGs) including Mix Engineer of the Year 2016 and 2019. Credits include, David Byrne, Frank Ocean, Caribou, Goldfrapp, Erasure, The xx, Sampha, Jamie xx, Jungle, FKA Twigs, Glass Animals, Alma, Hot Chip, Marika Hackman, Honne, Jack Garratt, Manic Street Preachers, Villagers, Courtney Barnett, Austra, Tourist, Richard Russell, Let's Eat Grandma, Young Fathers, Georgia, Bat For Lashes and Race Horses.

David Wrench mixes in Dolby Atmos

Career

Solo career 
As a musician, Wrench first came to public attention in 1990 with his first group Nid Madagascar who released the first Welsh-language acid house record "Lledrith Lliw" as a 12" single in 1990. This was followed by his first solo album Blow Winds Blow, released via Ankst in 1997. After its release, Wrench began working as an engineer, producer and occasional instrumentalist for artists. His early engineering and production credits from this period include records by British Sea Power, Jackie Leven and The Blueskins, Zabrinski, MC Mabon, Julian Cope (Brain Donor) and Welsh Music Prize winning album from Georgia Ruth.  Mix credits from this time include James Yorkston, Caribou (Albums Andorra and Swim), Week of Pines and Y Niwl.

In 2010 Wrench released the album Spades & Hoes & Plows on Invada records. The album, which was produced by Julian Cope, comprises three re-workings of old revolutionary folk songs and one original instrumental piece based on the Rebecca riots. Writing in the Sunday Times, Stewart Lee described the album thus: "In the face of young people's new enthusiasm for trad-lite, the Welsh weirdo David Wrench threatens to reunpopularise folk music, foregrounding puritanical politics over unpalatable instrumentation at funereal tempos. Fans of Lisbee Stainton are unlikely to enjoy Wrench's punishing, 24-minute rendition of "The Blackleg Miner" despite the invigorating and apocalyptically primitive Mellotron interludes supplied by Julian Cope's Black Sheep band. These weary recitations of traditional protest songs require patience, but by Helyntion Beca, a wordless closing workout inspired by 19th-century black-face transvestites attacking Carmarthenshire toll gates, the LP achieves a tortuous transcendence."

Production, mixing, engineering

2004–2014 
When not working on his own music, David Wrench is a studio Record Producer and Engineer. Wrench's production and mix credits from 2004 to 2014 include a number of critically acclaimed albums for Bear in Heaven (I Love You, It's Cool), Alessi's Ark (Time Travel), Race Horses (Goodbye Falkenberg), The Lizzies (St. John), Holy Coves (Peruvian Mistake), Zun Zun Egui (Katang), Y Niwl, Gwyneth Glyn, Skinny Lister (Forge & Flagon) and Caribou (Swim). As an Engineer he worked on albums by Bat For Lashes, Everything Everything, Kathryn Williams, Guillemotts, Beth Orton, James Yorkston, Nancy Elizabeth and Fanfarlo.

2014–present 
In 2014 he mixed FKA Twigs’ hugely lauded LP1, and Jungle's self titled debut album, both subsequently nominated for the Mercury Prize.

2015 saw Wrench work again with Dan Snaith aka Caribou on the album Our Love which went on to be nominated in the Best Dance/Electronic album at the 2015 Grammy Awards.

In 2016 Wrench mixed "Self Control" on Frank Ocean's second studio album Blonde.

In 2017, he mixed Sampha’s Mercury Prize and Brit Award winning album Process, and the following year he mixed David Byrne’s American Utopia, which was subsequently nominated for Best Alternative Album at the 61st Grammy Awards.  Wrench’s other mix and producing credits from 2017/2018 include Goldfrapp Silver Eye, The xx’s I See You, Gwenno’s Le Kov (Cornish language album), tracks from Richard Russell’s EP Everything Is Recorded,Honne Love Me/Love Me Not, Lo Moon, For Me It’s You, Blossoms album Cool Like You and Let’s Eat Grandma I’m All Ears.

Wrench mixed Erasure's The Neon, the band's eighteenth studio album released in August 2020 by Mute Records. The album debuted at number four on the UK Albums Chart with 8,394 copies sold in its first week, the duo's highest-charting album since I Say I Say I Say (1994). In 2020 David also worked with Arlo Parks on tracks "Black Dog", "Eugene" and "Hurt". The latter two have been BBC Radio 1’s Tune of the Week and Annie’s Mac’s Hottest Record. Parks won the AIM Independent Music Awards 2020 ‘One To Watch', was included in The NME 100, longlisted for BBC Sound of 2020 and went on to win a Brit Award for Breakthrough Artist, the Mercury Music Prize and was nominated for a Grammy. 

Other releases of 2020 include Ellie Goulding's track "New Heights" from new album Brightest Blue, Jamie xx single "idontknow", Caribou album Suddenly and recent Frank Ocean tracks.

Other mixing and producing projects during this period include "Gosh" from Jamie xx’s In Colour (2015); tracks from Glass Animals’ How To Be A Human Being (2016), their debut Zaba (2014) and also their most recent release Dreamland (2020); Marika Hackman Any Human Friend (2019); Alma Bad News Baby (2019), Manic Street Preachers The Ultra Livid Lament (2021) Villagers Fever Dreams (2021), Courtney Barnett Things Take Time, Take Time (2022). More recent projects include production and mix on Let’s Eat Grandma Two Ribbons, mix on Lil Silva Yesterday Is Heavy, mix on Hercules and Love affair In Amber, mix on Oliver Sim Hideous Bastard and mix on Shygirls’s forthcoming album

Other projects 
 
In 2015, Wrench provided surround sound mixing of Wayne McGregor’s ballet Tree Of Codes for its debut at the Manchester Opera House for the Manchester International Festival. The ballet features music by Jamie xx, and visual design by Olafur Eliasson. The ballet was highly acclaimed, and continues to tour.

In 2018, he formed the band audiobooks alongside singer, artist and model Evangeline Ling. The band signed to Heavenly Recordings and released their debut album Now! (in a minute) in November 2018. In 2021 audiobooks released their second LP ‘Astro Tough’

Discography

Albums

 1997: Blow Winds Blow (vinyl LP/audio CD)
 1999: You Have Just been Poisened by The Serpents (audio CD with The Serpents)
 2005: The Atomic World of Tomorrow (audio CD)
 2010: Spades & Hoes & Plows (audio CD)

Singles and EPs

 1990: "Lledrith Lliw" (12" vinyl EP with Nid Madagascar)
 1997: "Black Roses" (7" vinyl)
 1997: "The Ballad of the Christmas Tree and the Silver Birch" (7" vinyl)
 1998: "No Mask, No Cloak, Dim Gobaith" (7" vinyl with The Serpents)
 1998: "Sings the Songs of the Shangri Las" (7" vinyl EP)
 2004: "Superhorny" / "Fuck You And Your War on Terror" (12" vinyl & CD EP)
 2004: "World War IV" (CD EP)

Production credits 
Selected production and mixing credits

References

External links 
 Head Heritage-Spades & Hoes & Plows Mini-site for Spades & Hoes & Plows album
 BBC "mini site" for David Wrench
 David Wrench Discography
 AllMusic
 

Living people
Year of birth missing (living people)
British electronic musicians
Welsh multi-instrumentalists
People with albinism
Welsh male singers
Welsh-language singers
Welsh pop singers
Synth-pop singers